Deborah Jo Billingsley (May 28, 1952 – June 24, 2010) was an American singer, soloist, songwriter and recording artist. She was best known for her work with The Honkettes, backing vocalists for the Southern rock band Lynyrd Skynyrd.

Lynyrd Skynyrd
Billingsley was born in Memphis, Tennessee, to Doc and Hazel Billingsley.  The family soon moved to Senatobia, Mississippi from Harmontown, Mississippi, where she was raised. In December 1975 she was hired, along with Cassie Gaines and Leslie Hawkins, as backing singers for the Southern Rock band Lynyrd Skynyrd, whose leader, Ronnie Van Zant, dubbed them "The Honkettes".

An October 20, 1977 airplane crash killed several members of the band and road crew, but Billingsley was the only band member not on the flight. At the time, she was under a doctor's care in Senatobia, Mississippi, dealing with health problems brought about by substance abuse. According to Billingsley, this experience led her to become a born-again Christian.

Performances
Billingsley did not perform with a re-formed Lynyrd Skynyrd after the 1977 plane crash at Charlie Daniels' 1979 Volunteer Jam, because she was not invited.  She was at the opening of Freebird The Movie at Atlanta's Fox Theatre in 1995.  And, she sang "Sweet Home Alabama" at Lynyrd Skynyrd's induction into the Rock and Roll Hall of Fame in 2006.  She also performed with members of the group at occasional charity or memorial events .

In 2005, she was called upon by her friend, Mark Basile, a guitarist from New York, who invited her to perform several times as "The Honkettes" in an alternative version of Lynyrd Skynyrd called "The Saturday Night Special Band" that included former Skynyrd members Ed King, Artimus Pyle and Leslie Hawkins, which helped raise money for Hurricane Katrina victims. JoJo, Leslie and newcomer Donna Basile, rounded out the Honkettes.

In 2007, JoJo appeared at Jam-A-Que (a southern rock get-together) with members of the Play It Again Jam in Pleasant view Tennessee. Her friend Jane Van Zant was also there.

Billingsley also made many television and radio appearances, appeared in several movies and DVDs, and traveled extensively. Her final CD was titled I Will Obey.

Personal life
Billingsley lived with her husband, Tim, and her daughter, Destiny, in Cullman, Alabama where they attended Spirit Life Church. Her son, Justin, is in the US Navy.

Billingsley died in Cullman on June 24, 2010 from cancer at the age of 58.

References

External links
Interview Bands Of Dixie & SweetHomeMusic.fr (2008)
 A Tennessee Concerts Tribute to JoJo Billingsley

1952 births
2010 deaths
American women rock singers
Deaths from cancer in Alabama
Lynyrd Skynyrd members
People from Cullman, Alabama
People from Lafayette County, Mississippi
People from Senatobia, Mississippi